Ben Lomond, also known as Ben Lomond Plantation, is a historic plantation house located at Bull Run, Prince William County, Virginia. It was built in 1837, and is a two-story, five bay, red sandstone dwelling with a gable roof. The house has a central-hall plan and one-story frame kitchen addition.  One-story pedimented porches shelter the main (north) and rear (south) entries.  Also on the property are the contributing frame two-story tenant's house, brick pumphouse, and a bunkhouse dated to the early 20th century; and a meat house, dairy, and slave quarters dated to the late-1830s.

It was listed on the National Register of Historic Places in 1980.

The house is owned by the County and is open for tour as a Civil War-period historic house museum.

References

External links
Ben Lomond Historic Site - Prince William County
Ben Lomond, State Route 234, Manassas, Manassas, VA: 2 photos at Historic American Buildings Survey

Historic American Buildings Survey in Virginia
Plantation houses in Virginia
Houses on the National Register of Historic Places in Virginia
Houses completed in 1837
Houses in Prince William County, Virginia
National Register of Historic Places in Prince William County, Virginia
Museums in Prince William County, Virginia
Historic house museums in Virginia
Slave cabins and quarters in the United States